I.M. Meen is a 1995 fantasy educational game for DOS to teach grammar to children. It is named for its villain, Ignatius Mortimer Meen, a "diabolical librarian" who lures young readers into an enchanted labyrinth and imprisons them with monsters and magic.

The goal of the game is to escape the labyrinth and free other children. This is accomplished by "shooting spiders and similar monsters" and deciphering grammatical mistakes in scrolls written by Meen.

The game was created by Russo-American company Animation Magic, which also animated the CD-i games Link: The Faces of Evil and Zelda: The Wand of Gamelon. Peter Berkrot provided the voice of I.M. Meen, while gnome henchman Gnorris was voiced by John Mahon.

Plot
In the introduction cutscene, Ignatius Mortimer Meen introduces himself via song as an evil magician who despises children and learning. He sings about creating a magical book that sucks children into an abysmal labyrinth upon reading it. 

At the end of the musical number, the book sucks two children into an underground labyrinth, where they are found by monstrous guardians and locked into cells. Players play as two children named Scott and Katie, who are trapped inside this labyrinth. Gnorris, a gnome who has betrayed I.M. Meen, helps the two escape and, after sending them to rescue the other children, presents a magic orb so he can contact the player at any time. He gives hints as the game progresses and warns whenever a boss is nearby.

The player travels through the labyrinth, defeating the monsters and rescuing the children, causing the labyrinth's condition to rapidly deteriorate. The player must eventually confront I.M. Meen himself and defeat him using Writewell's Book of Better Grammar, which he has stolen and hidden in the labyrinth. After his defeat, the magician vows revenge and disappears, declaring that he will return and make good on his promise.

Gameplay
The game contains 36 levels with nine locations, including a tower, a dungeon, sewers, caves, catacombs, hedgerow mazes, castles, laboratories, and libraries. The player must rescue all the children on each level to get to the next one, which is done by fixing grammar mistakes in various scrolls. In every fourth level, the player must defeat a boss monster, otherwise known as one of I.M. Meen's special pets, to advance to a new area. There are items in the labyrinth that can be used to help the player defeat the various monsters that dwell in the labyrinth, as well as help them out in other ways. The player has an Agility Meter, similar to a health meter that, when it runs out, takes the player back to the beginning of the level and removes all items collected on that level. Near the end of the game, the player must defeat I.M Meen himself, who can only be harmed by the Writewell's Book of Better Grammar (other weapons have no effect on him at all). Defeating him and solving the last scroll wins the game.

Reception

The Contra Costa Times gave the game a positive review, calling it "the first computer game for young children to use the same fast 3-D graphics found in Doom" and praising it for its educational themes. Brad Cook of Allgame thought that the game's graphics and sound were well-executed, and thought that the game was well-developed for its time, but concluded his review by saying, "Since this program set out first and foremost to be an educational product, I'll have to give it a low mark because it simply fails to do that, despite how well-done the rest of it is" and gave the game two stars out of five.

Legacy
A 1996 sequel to the game was made, titled Chill Manor, featuring a story about I.M. Meen's presumed wife, Ophelia Chill, who obtains the Book of Ages and tears out all the pages, allowing her to rewrite history. Meen appears at the game's ending to rescue Ophelia after she is tied to a chair. I.M. Meen, as well as Sonic's Schoolhouse and 3D Dinosaur Adventure: Save the Dinosaurs, has been named as one of the "creepy, bad" inspirations for the indie game Baldi's Basics in Education and Learning.

Beginning circa 2005, I. M. Meen'''s animated cutscenes became a major source material for YouTube Poops, among cutscenes from other Animation Magic games including Link: The Faces of Evil and Zelda: The Wand of Gamelon.'' Multiple YouTube Poops feature Meen as a fourth-wall-breaking character, aware of his existence within the edited video and directly insulting the video's creator.

References

External links

 I.M. Meen at Internet Archive

1995 video games
Children's educational video games
DOS games
DOS-only games
English-language-only video games
First-person shooters
Internet memes
North America-exclusive video games
Video game memes
Video games developed in the United States
Video games featuring protagonists of selectable gender
Video games set in castles
Video games with 2.5D graphics
Sprite-based first-person shooters
Simon & Schuster Interactive games
Single-player video games